As of September 2016, the International Union for Conservation of Nature (IUCN) lists 910 data deficient reptile species. 18% of all evaluated reptile species are listed as data deficient. 
Of the subpopulations of reptiles evaluated by the IUCN, two species subpopulations have been assessed as data deficient.

This is a complete list of data deficient reptile species evaluated by the IUCN. Species which have data deficient subpopulations (or stocks) are indicated.

Turtles and tortoises

Species

Subpopulations
Leatherback sea turtle (Dermochelys coriacea) (2 subpopulations)

Lizards
There are 419 lizard species evaluated as data deficient.

Anguids

Diplodactylids

Chameleons

Anoles

Gekkonids

Wall lizards

Skinks

Spectacled lizards

Sphaerodactylids

Night lizards

Worm lizards

Neotropical ground lizards

Dragon lizards

Phrynosomatids

Varanids

Liolaemids

Other lizard species

Snakes
There are 480 snake species evaluated as data deficient.

Pseudoxyrhophiids

Typhlopid blind snakes

Vipers

Dipsadids

Shield-tailed snakes

Elapids

Calamariids

Lamprophiids

Indo-Australian water snakes

Colubrids

Keelbacks

Burrowing asps

Dawn blind snakes

Thread snakes

Gerrhopilids

Other snake species

See also 
 Lists of IUCN Red List data deficient species
 List of least concern reptiles
 List of near threatened reptiles
 List of vulnerable reptiles
 List of endangered reptiles
 List of critically endangered reptiles
 List of recently extinct reptiles

References 

Reptiles
Data deficient reptiles
Data deficient reptiles